Mademoiselle X is a 1945 French drama film directed by Pierre Billon and starring Madeleine Sologne, André Luguet and Ketti Gallian.

It was partly shot at the Saint-Maurice Studios in Paris. The film's sets were designed by the art directors Auguste Capelier and Georges Wakhévitch. The producer André Paulvé had recently been removed by the authorities from The Children of Paradise on account of his partial Jewish heritage and shifted to this less prestigious production, likely due to the intervention of his rival Alfred Greven of Continental Films. The film went into production In May 1944 shortly before the Liberation.

Cast
 Madeleine Sologne as Madeleine Ardouin
 André Luguet as Dominique Ségard
 Ketti Gallian as Catherine Nanteuil
 Aimé Clariond as Michel Courbet
 Pierre Palau as Victor
 André Bervil as Nicolas - l'acteur
 Raymond Rognoni as Le maire
 Charles Lemontier as L'employé des pompes funèbres

References

Bibliography 
 Turk, Edward Baron . Child of Paradise: Marcel Carné and the Golden Age of French Cinema. Harvard University Press, 1989.

External links 
 

1945 films
French drama films
1945 drama films
1940s French-language films
Films directed by Pierre Billon
French black-and-white films
1940s French films